Mihai Alexandru Eșanu (born 25 July 1998) is a Romanian professional footballer who plays as a goalkeeper for Liga I club Chindia Târgovişte.

He made his debut in Liga I in August 2020, for Dinamo București, in a game against Concordia Chiajna. In his career, Eșanu also played for CS Balotești. In 2022, he signed a contract with Chindia Târgovişte.

Career statistics

Club

References

External links
 
 

1998 births
Living people
Footballers from Bucharest
Romanian footballers
Association football goalkeepers
Liga I players
Liga II players
FC Dinamo București players
CS Balotești players
ASC Daco-Getica București players
FCV Farul Constanța players
AFC Chindia Târgoviște players
Romania under-21 international footballers